The Venezuela men's national volleyball team represents Venezuela in international volleyball competitions and friendly matches. In 1962 the squad claimed its first international medal (a bronze) at the South American Championship.

The biggest success for Venezuela came in 2003, when the team won the Pan American Games.

Results

Olympic Games
2008 — 9th place
2020 — 12th place

World Championship
 2002 — 17th place
 2006 — 17th place
 2010 — 19th place
 2014 — 17th place

World League
1990 to 2000 — did not compete
2001 — 13th place
2002 — 13th place
2003 — 13th place
2004 — did not compete
2005 — 7th place
2006 — did not compete
2007 — did not compete
2008 — 13th place
2009 — 16th place
2010 to 2014 — did not compete
2015 — 30th place
2016 — 30th place
2017 — 34th place

America Cup
1998 — 5th place
1999 — 6th place
2000 — 6th place
2001 — 5th place
2005 — 6th place
2007 — did not compete
2008 —  Bronze

Bolivarian Games
 1938 — 1st place
 1965 — 1st place
 1973 — 1st place
 1977 — 1st place
 1985 — 2nd place
 2001 — 1st place
 2005 — 1st place
 2009 — 1st place
 2013 — 2nd place

Pan-American Games
1971 — 4th place
1995 — 4th place
2003 —  Gold
2007 — 4th place

Pan-American Cup
2010 — 9th place
2011 — 6th place
2012 — 7th place
2014 — 5th place

Current squad
The following is the Venezuelan roster in the 2017 World League.

Head coach: Ronald Sarti

Former squads
2002 FIVB World League — 13th place (tied)
 Jorge Reyes, Manuel Blanco, Andy Rojas, Gustavo Valderrama, Rodman Valera, Carlos Luna, Luis Díaz, Andrés Manzanillo, Héctor Guzmán, Ernardo Gómez (c), José Torres, Ronald Méndez, Thomas Ereu, Iván Márquez, Jorge Silva, Juan Carlos Blanco, and Fredy Cedeño. Head coach: José David Suárez.
2002 World Championship — 17th place (tied)
 Carlos Tejeda, Andy Rojas, Gustavo Valderrama, Rodman Valera, Carlos Luna, Luis Díaz, Andrés Manzanillo, Héctor Guzmán, Ronald Méndez, Ernardo Gómez (c), Thomas Ereu, and Fredy Cedeño. Head coach: José David Suárez.
2003 FIVB World League — 13th place (tied)
Héctor Ubina, Luis E. Orta, Andy Rojas, Gustavo Valderrama, Rodman Valera, Carlos Luna, Luis Díaz, Andrés Manzanillo, Héctor Guzmán, Ronald Méndez, Ernardo Gómez (c), Carlos Tejeda, Daniel Mata, Thomas Ereu, Iván Márquez, Jorge Silva, Juan Carlos Blanco, and Fredy Cedeño. Head coach: José David Suarez.
2003 Pan American Games —  Gold Medal
Juan Carlos Blanco, Luis Díaz, Thomas Ereu, Ernardo Gómez (c), Carlos Luna, Andrés Manzanillo, Iván Márquez, Ronald Méndez, Andy Rojas, Carlos Tejeda, Gustavo Valderrama, and Rodman Valera.
2003 FIVB World Cup — 8th place
Juan Carlos Blanco, Fredy Cedeño, Luis Díaz, Luis E. Orta, Ernardo Gómez (c), Carlos Luna, Andrés Manzanillo, Iván Márquez, Ronald Méndez, Luis E. Orta, Gustavo Valderrama, and Rodman Valera. Head coach: Miguel Cambero.
2005 America's Cup — 6th place
Deivi Yustiz, Andy Rojas, Gustavo Valderrama, Rodman Valera, Carlos Luna, Luis Díaz, Andrés Manzanillo, Ernardo Gómez, Carlos Tejeda, Iván Márquez, Juan Carlos Blanco, and Fredy Cedeño. Head coach: Argimiro Méndez.
2006 World Championship — 17th place (tied)
Ismel Ramos, Joel Silva, Carlos Luna, Luis Díaz, Renzo Sánchez, Ernardo Gómez, Carlos Tejeda, Iván Márquez, Thomas Ereu, Francisco Soteldo, Juan Carlos Blanco, and Fredy Cedeño. Head coach: Eliseo Ramos.

References

External links
Official website
FIVB profile

Volleyball
National men's volleyball teams
Men's sport in Venezuela
Volleyball in Venezuela